The Yamaha Virago 535 is a motorcycle manufactured by Yamaha Motor Corporation.

It is unique in being one of the few smaller cruiser-style motorcycles available with a shaft drive instead of a chain or belt final drive system, as well as a V-twin engine of that size. Its heavily chromed body styling is also distinctive.

This model was discontinued in 2004 in the US and 2003 in the UK as the "star" range of motorcycles form took over as the cruiser line from Yamaha. The V-Star 650 (known as the DragStar in Europe) could be seen as the successor to the XV535.

1987–1988 US models
First and only year with the fuel tank under the seat, as the only fuel storage. The "fuel tank" on top, in front of the driver, was a dummy containing electric equipment only. This limited its range considerably.

containing 1988 UK model

1988–1994 US models

1989–1994 UK models

See also
 Yamaha Virago
 Yamaha Virago 750
 Yamaha Virago 1100
 Yamaha DragStar 650 XVS550/XVS650A
 Yamaha DragStar 1100 XVS1100

References

Bibliography

External links

Virago 535
Cruiser motorcycles
Motorcycles introduced in 1987
Shaft drive motorcycles